Pterolophioides is a genus of longhorn beetles of the subfamily Lamiinae, containing the following species:

 Pterolophioides camerunensis Breuning, 1967
 Pterolophioides guineensis Breuning, 1955
 Pterolophioides laterifuscus (Fairmaire, 1886)
 Pterolophioides stramentosus Breuning, 1942
 Pterolophioides subunicolor Breuning, 1969

References

Desmiphorini